Harold Everett (13 November 1891 – 27 April 1979) was an English first-class cricketer and civil servant.

Everett was born at Kennington. He represented the Civil Service cricket team in its only appearance in first-class cricket against the touring New Zealanders at Chiswick in 1927. Batting twice during the match, he scored 2 runs in the Civil Service first-innings before being dismissed by Roger Blunt, while in their second-innings he was dismissed without scoring by Matt Henderson. He bowled eight wicketless overs in the New Zealanders only innings, conceding 34 runs. 

He died at East Preston, West Sussex in April 1979.

References

External links

1891 births
1979 deaths
People from Kennington
English civil servants
English cricketers
Civil Service cricketers
People from East Preston, West Sussex